Somerby (or Somerby by Gainsborough) is a hamlet in the West Lindsey district of Lincolnshire, England.

The settlement is best known as the home of Richard Topcliffe, the infamous Tudor torturer and persecutor of Roman Catholics. Topcliffe brought one of his victims, Anne Bellamy, to Somerby in 1593 where she had a baby - believed to be Topcliffe's. He died here in 1604. 

Excavations at Somerby in 1957 showed it was once larger, revealing  15th-century streets and house foundations, with finds ranging from the 12th to the 16th century. Much of the medieval village of Somerby was the site of an ancient deer park which belonged to Somerby Park  mansion.

Somerby Park is described in the 1872 Whites Directory as "a commodious ancient mansion in the Elizabethan style".

References

Hamlets in Lincolnshire
West Lindsey District